Offer Nissim is an Israeli DJ, remixer, and record producer. He produced the winning entry of the Eurovision Song Contest 1998, "Diva", by Dana International. Besides his work with Dana International, Nissim has often collaborated with Maya Simantov on songs such as "For your Love", "Everybody Needs a Man", "Alone", and "First Time", and has produced official remixes for various artists, including Madonna and Cher.

Biography and career

Offer Nissim was born in Israel, to parents of Sephardic Jewish (Iraqi-Jewish) descent. He displayed a keen interest in music from a young age. His musical career started in 1979, when he had to stand in for an absent DJ at Tel Aviv's Theater Club. The Theater Club was also the place where, during the following decade, he formed important professional relationships, among them with Yaron Cohen, who would go on to become Dana International.

In 1993, Nissim produced Dana International's debut single, "Saida Sultana", and the pair was soon invited to appear with the song on Rivka Michaeli's popular prime time variety show, Siba La’mesiba (“Reason to party”). Following a record deal with IMP, Nissim produced two albums for Dana International: her 1993 debut and Umpatampa (1994).

In 1998, Dana International represented Israel at the 43rd Eurovision Song Contest with "Diva", a song written by Svika Pick and produced by Nissim. The song won the contest bringing the country its coveted third victory and Offer Nissim further recognition. However, soon after the victory, Nissim and Dana International went their separate ways as a result of artistic differences. Already an established DJ on the local gay scene, Nissim decided give up producing and become a full time DJ.

In the 2000s, Nissim collaborated with Israeli singer Maya Simantov and Grammy-winning Austrian-American DJ Peter Rauhofer. Nissim has produced several official remixes for Madonna, Pet Shop Boys, Christina Aguilera, Cher, Mylène Farmer, Deborah Cox, Dana International, Kristine W and other dance pop acts.

Nissim has ranked four times on DJ Magazines annual list of Top 100 DJs: in 2006 (29th), in 2007 (56th), in 2008 (51st) and in 2009 (43rd).

Discography

Albums

2002 - Excited
2004 - Searching (2 CDs) 
2005 - First Time (ft. Maya Simantov) 
2005 - OfferNissim 
2005 - The Remixes 
2006 - Second Time (ft. Maya Simantov) (2 CDs) 
2007 - Forever Tel Aviv (2 CDs) 
2008 - Happy People (2 CDs)
2009 - Happy People (Winter Edition)
2009 - Remixed (2 CDs) 
2010 - Pride All Over
2010 - Over You (ft. Maya Simantov)
2017 - Love (2 CDs) 
2020 - SuperNatural

DJ Sets / Podcasts
2006 - Live @ Roxy (The Main Event) 
2009 - We Can! 
2012 - MDNA Live Show 
2012 - Holidays 2012 
2013 - Holidays 2013 
2014 - This is Pride 2014 
2015 - This is Pride 2015 
2016 - This is Pride 2016 
2016 - Holidays 2016 
2017 - This is Pride 2017 
2018 - This Is Pride 2018 
2019 - This Is Pride 2019 
2021 - This Is Pride 2021 
2022 - Offer Nissim - Happy Pink Purim 
2022 - Independence Day 2022 - Special Edition For GLZ Radio 
2022 - This Is Pride 2022

Production credits

Dana International
 1993 Dana International (Album)
 1994 UMPATAMPA (Album)
 1995 E.P. Tampa (E.P)
 1996 Maganona (Album)
 1996 Cinquemilla (Single)
 1998 Diva (Winning Song of Eurovision 98')
 1999 Free (Album)
 1999 Free (Single)
 1999 Woman In Love (Single)
 2016 We Can Make It (Single)

Original productions 
1995
 Offer Nissim ft. Lee, Laa, Loo Girls - Well, Well, Well (You Smell Like Hell) (Volume 9 Compilation)

2001
 Offer Nissim ft. Sonny - Now Is The Time

2002
 Offer Nissim ft. Mickiyagi - I'm So Excited

2003
 Offer Nissim ft. Mickiyagi - Love Takes You

2004
 Offer Nissim ft. Maya Simantov - Searching
 Offer Nissim ft. Maya Simantov - That's The Way I Like It
 Offer Nissim ft. Maya Simantov - Only You

2005
 Offer Nissim ft. Maya Simantov - Alone
 Offer Nissim ft. Maya Simantov - Anything
 Offer Nissim ft. Maya Simantov - First Time
 Offer Nissim ft. Maya Simantov - Rain
 Offer Nissim ft. Maya Simantov - Heartbreaking
 Offer Nissim ft. Maya Simantov - Summer Night City
 Offer Nissim ft. Maya Simantov - Kol A'holam
 Offer Nissim ft. Maya Simantov - On My Own
 Offer Nissim Vs. Intermissiom - Piece of My Heart
 Offer Nissim ft. Amuka - I Want More

2006
 Offer Nissim ft. Maya Simantov - Perfect Love
 Offer Nissim ft. Maya Simantov - Be My Boyfriend
 Offer Nissim ft. Maya Simantov- For Your Love
 Offer Nissim ft. Maya Simantov - First Time (When I'm With You Ver.)

2007
 Offer Nissim ft. Ivri Lider - Nights in White Satin
 Offer Nissim ft. Amir Fay-Guttman - Always
 Offer Nissim ft. Assaf Amdursky - Wild is The Wind
 Offer Nissim ft. Maya Simantov - Wish You Were Here

2008
 Offer Nissim ft. Maya Simantov - Happy People
 Offer Nissim ft. Maya Simantov - I'm In Love
 Offer Nissim ft. Maya Simantov - Why
 Offer Nissim ft. Maya Simantov - Love
 Offer Nissim ft. Ohad Haeim - Change
 Offer Nissim ft. Epiphony - Out Of My Skin
 Offer Nissim ft. Epiphony - Believe In Me
 Offer Nissim ft. Epiphony - One More Night
 Offer Nissim ft. Epiphony - Knowing Me Knowing You
 Offer Nissim ft. Symphony Extreme - Remmber My Name
 Offer Nissim ft. Symphony Extreme - I Close My Eyes

2009
 Offer Nissim - Bimbo
 Offer Nissim - Rhythm Of The Nile
 Offer Nissim ft. Maya Simantov - Hook Up
 Offer Nissim ft. Maya Simantov - Illusion
 Offer Nissim ft. Maya Simantov - You'll Never Know
 Offer Nissim ft. Maya Simantov - Tel-Aviv
 Offer Nissim ft. Maya Simantov - Superman
 Offer Nissim ft. Maya Simantov - Holding on
 Offer Nissim ft. Maya Simantov - Cuando
 Offer Nissim ft. Epiphony - Story Ending
 Offer Nissim ft. Epiphony - Mr. Charming
 Offer Nissim ft. Epiphony - Coffee Break
 Offer Nissim ft. Epiphony - Boxing Ring

2010
 Offer Nissim - Out Of My Skin (Turkish Ver.)
 Offer Nissim ft. Maya Simantov - Over You
 Offer Nissim ft. Maya Simantov - It Was Love
 Offer Nissim ft. Maya Simantov - I'm That Chick
 Offer Nissim ft. Maya Simantov - The Only One
 Offer Nissim ft. Maya Simantov - You Were So Right
 Offer Nissim ft. Shlomi Saranga - Essi
 Offer Nissim ft. Nikka – The One and Only
 Offer Nissim ft. Mickiyagi – Freedom to Ya'All
 Offer Nissim ft. Maya Simantov – Freak Control
 Offer Nissim – Sound of Bamboo
 Offer Nissim ft. Maya Simantov – My Only One

2011
 Offer Nissim ft. Maya Simantov – La Bez'
 Offer Nissim ft. Maya Buskila, Meital & Maya – Love Child
 Offer Nissim – Sevillia Nights
 Offer Nissim ft. Epiphony – Million Stars
 Offer Nissim ft. Epiphony – Break My World
 Offer Nissim ft. Maya Simantov & Vanessa Klein – Breaking Away
 Offer Nissim pres. The Dynasty Season – The Children
 Offer Nissim ft. Omri Mizrachi – Don't Stop the Dance
 Offer Nissim ft. Maya Simantov – I'd Give You All I Have
 Offer Nissim ft. Epiphony – Drip Drop
 Offer Nissim ft. Epiphony & Gabriel Butler – Hands On

2012
 Offer Nissim ft. Maya Simantov – All The Love
 Offer Nissim & Itay Kalderone ft. Maya Siman tov – Over & Over
 Offer Nissim ft. Amir Haddad – De'senchante'e
 Offer Nissim ft. Meital De Razon – My Pride
 Offer Nissim & Asi Tal ft. Meital De Razon – On The Radio 
 Offer Nissim ft. Ilan Peled – Non Je Ne Regrette Rien
 Offer Nissim ft. Betti – Gracias A La Vida

2013
 Offer Nissim - Osa Osa
 Offer Nissim & Asi Tal ft. Maya Simantov - Breath
 Offer Nissim ft. Ilan Peled – Haw Haw
 Offer Nissim ft. Eyal Golan - Eshal

2014
 Dana International – Get Down On Me (Cancelled –Rerecorded with Maya Simantov as 'Everybody Needs a Man')
 Offer Nissim ft. Maya Simantov – Danger Love
 Offer Nissim ft. Maya Simantov – Everybody Needs A Man
 Offer Nissim ft. Meital De-Razon – End to Start
 Offer Nissim ft. Ilan Peled - Aprikose

2015
 Offer Nissim ft. Maya Simantov – Let Me Live
 Offer Nissim ft. Maya Simantov & Rita – Let Me Live (Unreleased)
 Offer Nissim ft. Ilan Peled & Yael Poliakov – C’est Coccinelle 
 Offer Nissim ft. Ilan Peled – C’est Coccinelle (Reconstruction Mix) 
 Offer Nissim ft. Vladi Blayberg – Cold Song (Oscar Wilde Tribute)
 Offer Nissim ft. Maya Simantov – Wake Up
 Offer Nissim ft. Cim W. – I Wanna Be With You
 Offer Nissim ft. Maya Simantov – Hot Summer Night
 Offer Nissim ft. Sarit Hadad – Love U Till I Die

2016
 Offer Nissim ft. Maya Simantov – Open Up
 Offer Nissim ft. Ilan Peled - Udrub (Offer Nissim Mix) 
 Offer Nissim – Sex
 Offer Nissim ft. Zach Adam – You Need My Love
 Ilanit – Teresa Dimon's Love
 Offer Nissim ft. Dana International - We Can Make It
 Offer Nissim ft. Deborah Cox – My Air

2017
 Offer Nissim ft. Maya Simantov – Miracle (Part A & B)
 Offer Nissim ft. Ania Bikstein – Rokedet
 Offer Nissim ft. Gila Goldstein – Feel It
 Offer Nissim – Africa
 Offer Nissim ft. Ilan Peled, Harel Skaat, Maya Simantov & Keren Mor – Ain't No Mountain High Enough
 Offer Nissim ft. Maya Simantov – If You Only Knew
 Offer Nissim – Completely Yourself
 Offer Nissim – Umpatampa
 Offer Nissim ft. Sailo – Good Night Europe
 Offer Nissim ft. Ania Bikstein – A Boy Or A Man
 Offer Nissim ft. Maya Simantov – Deserve Love
 Offer Nissim ft. Ilan Peled – Zolushka I Belosnejka
 Offer Nissim ft. Rita – ALAY
 Offer Nissim ft. Sailo – Tragedy
 Offer Nissim ft. Meital De Razon – I Turn To You
 Offer Nissim ft. Maya Simantov – Cheating Love
 Offer Nissim ft. Sailo – Gotta Be Cool

2018
 Offer Nissim ft. Riki Ben-Ari - Fame
 Offer Nissim ft. Ilan Peled - My Pussy Hurts
 Offer Nissim ft. Maya Simantov - Rainbow
 Offer Nissim – Fucker
 Offer Nissim – Shalom Aleychem
 Offer Nissim – Open Your Eyes
 Offer Nissim – Up To The Top
 Offer Nissim ft. Ilan Peled - Pot Pot
 Offer Nissim ft. Maya Simantov – Heart Beat
 Offer Nissim ft. Nasrin Qadri - Lord Of Mercy
 Offer Nissim ft. Meital De Razon – Saved Me
 Offer Nissim ft. Sailo – Forgive Me
 Offer Nissim ft. Riki Ben-Ari - Dance The Night
 Offer Nissim Ft. Meital De Razon & Riki Ben-Ari - Better Man
 Offer Nissim Present. SJ Jackson & AJ Jackson - Dancing
 Offer Nissim ft. Eyal Golan - Lo Mevina Ivrit
 Offer Nissim ft. Ivana Lola - Kriminal Eye
 Offer Nissim ft. Ilan Peled - Mushi Mushi
 Offer Nissim - Set My Mind Free

2019
 Offer Nissim - Crazy Things At Night 

2021
 Offer Nissim ft. Maya Simantov - Like there's no tomorrow - club mix
 Offer Nissim ft. Harel Skaat - Ahava Nafshi (אהבה נפשי)
 Offer Nissim ft. Deborah Cox - Summer of love 
 Offer Nissim ft. Ivana Lola - Kissed by you

2022
 Offer Nissim ft. Meital De Razon - Like this like that
 Offer Nissim ft. Maya Simantov - Zero Fucks
 Offer Nissim Ft. Ilan Peled - Viado Presidente
 Offer Nissim X Netta Barzilai - We Are Drunk
 Offer Nissim Presents Linet & Ilan Peled - Falan Filan 
 Offer Nissim Ft. Rivka Zohar - Shoshanat Yaakov
 Offer Nissim X Tair Haim - Laila 
 Offer Nissim ft. Aviv Geffen & Ella Lee - Varod Mavrik (Glowing Pink - ורוד מבריק)
 Offer Nissim ft. Maya Simantov - Boys
 Offer Nissim ft. Maya Simantov - Bitch
 Offer Nissim - Atencion Alegria
 Offer Nissim - Fly robin fly (Silver Convention)
 Offer Nissim ft. Ilan Peled - Mesuchsechet (מסוכסכת)
 Offer Nissim - Move your body (Intro / Club)
 Offer Nissim - High in bed
 Ran Danker & Offer Nissim - Malkat Harahava - show mix (מלכת הרחבה)
 Offer Nissim - Get what I want 
 Offer Nissim - Underground 
 Offer Nissim ft. Maya Simantov - Let God

2023
 Offer Nissim X Odeya - Baleylot (בלילות)
  Offer Nissim X Tamir Grinberg - Our Love

Official remixes 

2002
Rita - Ma'wal (Offer Nissim Remix)

2004
Ivri Lider - Beautiful Eyes (Oriental Dub Remix)

2005
 Suzanne Palmer - Home (Offer Nissim Remix pt.1,2)
 Suzzanne Palmer - Fascinated (Offer Nissim Remix)
 Kristine W - Wonder of it All (Offer Nissim Mix)
 Deborah Cooper - Live You All Over (Offer Nissim Remix)
 Club69 - Twisted (2005 Rework)
 Deborah Cox - Easy as Life (Offer Nissim Remix)
 Rita - Jerusalem of Gold (Dub Remix)
 Ivri Lider - Cinderella Rockefella (Dub Remix)
 Ofra Haza - Love Song (Offer Nissim Remix)

2006
 Tony Moran - Something About You (Offer Nissim Remix pt.1,2&3)
 Suzzanne Palmer - Keep The Faith (Offer Nissim Remix)
 Angie Stone - I Wish I Didn't Miss You (Offer Nissim Remix)
 Fairuz - Eastern Drums (Offer Nissim Dub Remix)
 Christina Aguilera - Hurt (Offer Nissim Remix)

2007
 Beyonce - One Night Only (Offer Nissim Remix)
 Beyonce - Deja-Vu (Offer Nissim Remix)
 Suzzanne Palmer - Free My Love (Offer Nissim Remix)
 Kristine W - Be Alright (Offer Nissim Remix)
 Donna Summer - Power of Love (Offer Nissim Remix)
 Alain Chamfort - Manureva (2007 Rework)
 Amuka - Appreciate Me at Night (Offer Nissim Mash-up)
 Sarit Hadad - Ze Sh'shomer Alay (Offer Nissim & Yinon Yahel Remix)
 Santa Esmeralda - Cha Cha Cha (Offer Nissim Remix)

2008
 Deborah Cox - Everybody Dance (Offer Nissim Remix)
 Shirley Bassey - La Passione (Offer Nissim Remix)
 Suzanne Palmer - Eye Can See You (Offer Nissim Remix)
 Jennifer Lopez - Que Hiciste (Offer Nissim Remix)
 Dana International - Petra (2008 Reconstruction)
 Dana International - Maganuna (Reconstruction)
 Captain Hollywood - More and More (2008 Reconstruction)
 Erin Hamilton - Flame 2008 (Offer Nissim Remix)
 Christina Aguilera - Candyman (Offer Nissim Remix)
 Betty - Poison (Reconstruction)
 Ofra Haza - Latet (Reconstruction)
 Kadoc - Night Train (Offer Nissim Edit)
 Culture Beat - Your Love (Offer Nissim Remix)

2009
 Maya - Bringing You Home (Offer Nissim Reconstruction)
 Suzanne Palmer - You Stepped Into My Life

2010
 Shoshana D'amari - Still Here (Offer Nissim Remix)
 Ivri Lider - Fuck Off Berlin (Offer Nissim Remix)
 Anita Meyer – Why Tell Me Why (Offer Nissim Remix)
 Lara Catherine – Nuit Magique (Offer Nissim Remix)

2011
 TYP – 20 Seconds (Offer Nissim Remix)

2012
 TYP – D.I.S.C.O (Offer Nissim Remix)
 Madonna - Girl Gone Wild (Offer Nissim Club Mix)
 Madonna - Turn Up The Radio (Offer Nissim Club Mix)
 TYP – Be With You Tonight (Offer Nissim Remix)
 Meital De Razon & Asi Tal – Le Lo Le (Offer Nissim Club Mix)
 Rita – Bigharar (Offer Nissim Extended Remix)
 Offer Nissim ft. Maya Simantov – Happy People (2012 Remix)
 Offer Nissim ft. Josie Kats – After All The Love Is Gone (Offer Nissim Remix)
 Offer Nissim ft. Nasreen Qadri – Sawah (Offer Nissim Remix)

2013
 Offer Nissim –Osa Osa (Loud Mix)
 Suzanne Palmer – You Stepped (Into My Life) (2013 Remix)
 Meital De Razon & Asi Tal – Toda La Noche (Offer Nissim Remix)
 Offer Nissim Presents David Porter – Hang On Sloopy
 Assaf Amdursky – 15 Min (Offer Nissim Remix)
 Kristine W. – Everything That I Got (Offer Nissim Tel-Aviv Mix)
 Mr. Black – Wake Up (Offer Nissim Remix)

2014
 Rocking Son – Moskau (Offer Nissim Remix)
 Rockers Revenge – Walking on Sunshine (Offer Nissim Remix)
 Mylène Farmer - A l'ombre (Offer Nissim Remix)

2015
 Dikla – 7PM (Offer Nissim Remix)
 Madonna - Living For Love (Offer Nissim Living For Drama Remix)
 Madonna – Living For Love (Offer Nissim Dub Mix)
 Madonna – Living For Love (Living for Drums Mix)
 Madonna – Ghosttown (Offer Nissim Drama Mix)
 Madonna – Ghosttown (Offer Nissim Dub Mix)

2016
 Pet Shop Boys – The Pop Kids (Offer Nissim Drama Mix)
 Billie Ray Martin – Glittering Gutter (Offer Nissim Remix)
 Michelle Obama All-Star Girl Power Anthem – This Is For My Girls (Offer Nissim Remix)
 Pet Shop Boys – Say it to me (Offer Nissim Remix)
 Miri Paskal Ft. Firkat Al Nour - Tigi Nesam El Amar (Offer Nissim Remix) 
 Donna Summer & Barbra Streisand - Enough is Enough (Offer Nissim Drama Remix)

2017
 Vali – Ain't No Friend of Mine (Offer Nissim Remix)
 Offer Nissim ft. Ania Bikstein – Rokedet (Club MIx)
 Offer Nissim ft. Extasia & Zach Adam ft. Rony G. – Light Beams (Offer Nissim Remix)
 The Trash Mermaids – Cryptic Love (Offer Nissim Remix)
 Lara Fabian – Growing Wings (Offer Nissim Remix)
 Ivana Lola ft. AC & GetFar – Don’t You Hide (Offer Nissim Remix)
 Offer Nissim ft. Rivka Zohar – IL n’est Pas Comme Hier (Offer Nissim Remix)
 Offer Nissim ft. JHUD – Prayers For This World (Offer Nissim Remix)

2018
 U2 – Love Is Bigger Than Anything In Its Way (Offer Nissim Remix)
 The Trash Mermaids - Xperiel (Offer Nissim Remix)
 Anggun - The Good Is Back (Offer Nissim Remix)
 Jennifer Hudson - I'll Fight (Offer Nissim Remix)
 Cher - Gimme Gimme Gimme (A Man after Midnight) (Offer Nissim Needs A Man Remix)
 Miri Mesika - Mefahed Allay'ich (Offer Nissim Remix)
Vali - Pluto (Offer Nissim Remix)

2022
 Deborah Cox - Easy as life - Offer Nissim Show Mix
 Deborah Cox - Everybody dance - Offer Nissim Show Mix
 Rita (Israeli singer) & ELK DUENDE – Boom Boom Boom | Offer Nissim Remix / Show Mix 
 Rita (Israeli singer) & ELK - Baildor - Offer Nissim Remix

References

External links
Offer Nissim's Website
Offer Nissim's Soundcloud

Living people
Year of birth missing (living people)
Israeli dance musicians
Israeli DJs
Israeli record producers
People from Tel Aviv
LGBT DJs
LGBT Jews
Israeli gay musicians
Israeli Sephardi Jews
Israeli people of Iraqi-Jewish descent
Israeli Mizrahi Jews
20th-century LGBT people
21st-century LGBT people